Gaffneylania is an extinct genus of meiolaniid turtle from the Eocene of Patagonia. Gaffneylania is among the earliest known meiolaniids and, much like its later relatives, possessed characteristic horns atop its head. The shell appears to have had a serrated margin. Gaffneylania is a monotypic genus, only containing a single species, Gaffneylania auricularis.

History and naming
The first remains of Gaffneylania were uncovered in the summer of 2010 during fieldwork led by researchers of the Museo Paleontológico Egidio Feruglio and the Museo de Historia Natural de San Rafael. The fossils were recovered in the south-east of the Chubut Province of Argentina in the lower parts of the Sarmiento Formation. The holotype specimen, MPEF-PV 10556, consists of a partial skeleton including parts of the skull, most of the mandible, various limb remains and vertebrae as well as osteoderms and various parts of the carapace and plastron. Multiple referred specimen are also known, although these remains are less complete and primarily consist of isolated bones and shell remains.

The name honors the prolific paleontologist Eugene S. Gaffney, an authority on the anatomy and phylogeny of turtles in general and meiolaniids in particular. The second part of the name is of less clear origin. When Richard Owen named the giant monitor lizard Megalania, he translated the later part of the name as meaning "to roam about". Gaffney however argued that -lania is derived from the Greek word "lanius" meaning butcher. In this instance, Sterli and colleagues follow the etymology given by Owen. The species name meanwhile derives from auricle, the external ear, due to the prominent halfmoon-shaped rim that surrounds the tympanic cavity.

Description
The skull of Gaffneylania is hightly ankylosed (fused) and several of the sutures between the different skull bones are therefore not visible. The roof of the skull is not preserved, further obscuring the anatomy of the dorsal scutes. However, three scutes are visible surrounding the tympanic cavity, designated scutes K1, K2 and K3. The specifics of these scutes indicates that they aren't homologous with those of other meiolaniids, as later Australian forms only possess two scutes, J and K, while the Argentinian Niolamia has two J scutes, J1 and J2, and only a single K scute. A halfmoon-shaped rim, formed in part by the squamosal bone and the quadratojugal bone, is present behind the tympanic cavity and presents one of this genus' autapomorphies, a trait that sets Gaffneylania apart from any other meiolaniid. Like other meiolaniids, Gaffneylania possessed horns that protruded from the skull. In this specific case, the preserved horn is slightly curved back and up with a blunt and flat tip, but otherwise similar to that of Niolamia. However the exact position of this horn on the skull could not be determined as it wasn't found in articulation but was broken off from the rest of the skull.

The mandible is preserved almost in its entirety and covered extensively in a series of pits, ridges and grooves. The triturating surface, used to cut and grind, is made up entirely of the dentary and includes two cutting ridges, one lingual (closer to the tongue) and one labial (closer to the outside of the mouth). Gaffneylania lacks the accessory ridge that is present between the labial and lingual ridges of Meiolania and unlike in Meiolania or Niolamia, the labial ridge is taller. Both run parallel over most of their extent, but converge slightly towards the tip of the lower jaw. The labial ridge additionally forms a hook at the beginning of the mandibular symphysis.

The carapace is primarily known from various shell fragments, which generally show characteristics typical of meiolaniid turtles. The surface of the individual plates is ornamented by fine foramina and the bones grow thicker towards the outer edge of the shell. The upper part of the shell is only loosely connected to the armor of the belly (plastron). A partial nuchal plate, which would be situated at the front of the shell, is preserved, showing a slight notch and a serrated edge towards the front. Several pleural and peripheral plates are also known, the later of which forming the outermost rim of the turtle shell. The peripherals, like the nuchal, show a serrated edge. Some of the scutes that overly the bony carapace have also been identified.

The vertebrae of Gaffneylania generally resemble those of the later Meiolania. The forelimbs are short and robust based on the morphology of the humerus, with the authors comparing them to those of Meiolania platyceps, material tentatively referred to Niolamia and the much more basal Proganochelys. While the forelimbs are known from a complete and one partial humerus, the hindlimbs are only preserved through much more fragmentary material, specifically fragments of a femur and a tibia. The limbs were likely covered in a multitude of osteoderms, which have been found as individual fossils. These osteoderms show a great variety in their size and shape, ranging from large teardrop-shaped elements to small disc-shaped bones. All these osteoderms occurred on their own and don't appear to have been arranged in pairs or triads. The larger osteoderms may have been present at the flanks of the forearm, while the disc-shaped osteoderms were located closer to the middle.

Phylogeny
The initial strict consensus tree produced to determine the relationship between Gaffneylania and other meiolaniids suffered from the presence of multiple polytomies. In response a reduced strict consensus tree was calculated by the researchers, recognizing that the Gaffneylania, Patagoniaemys gasparinae and Hangaiemys hoburensis were all unstable and responsible for the problems with the initial tree. Due to the lack of important fossil material such as tail raings and skull scutes, Gaffneylania was recovered in multiple different positions within Meiolaniidae, which includes a basal position along Niolamia or a more derived placement amidst the Australian genera. Despite being regarded as a wildcard taxon and its varying position within the family, it was still determined that Gaffneylania consistently nested within Meiolaniidae.

The reduced strict consensus tree is depicted below, showing the different placements that Gaffneylania might occupy within the family.

Extinction
Sterli and colleagues propose that meiolaniids, and other turtles, went extinct in Patagonia during the middle Eocene after building pressure from climate change, creating colder and dryer conditions. They further suggest that Australasian meiolaniids escaped the same fate due to the fact that Australia, despite being subject to the same changing climate conditions, somewhat balanced out these changes through its continuous movement northward.

References

Meiolaniformes
Prehistoric turtle genera
Eocene turtles
Prehistoric turtles of South America
Eocene reptiles of South America
Casamayoran
Paleogene Argentina
Fossils of Argentina
Fossil taxa described in 2015
Sarmiento Formation